Dimitrios Koulouris (born 22 April 1991) is a Greek swimmer. He competed in the men's 200 metre breaststroke event at the 2016 Summer Olympics. He finished 35th in the heats with a time of 2:14.86. He did not qualify for the semifinals.

References

1991 births
Living people
Greek male swimmers
Olympic swimmers of Greece
Panathinaikos swimmers
Swimmers at the 2016 Summer Olympics
Place of birth missing (living people)
Mediterranean Games bronze medalists for Greece
Mediterranean Games medalists in swimming
Swimmers at the 2013 Mediterranean Games
Male breaststroke swimmers
20th-century Greek people
21st-century Greek people